RMIT's School of Vocational Business Education is an Australian vocational education school within the College of Business at the Royal Melbourne Institute of Technology (RMIT University), located in Melbourne, Victoria.

See also
RMIT University

References

External links
School of Business TAFE

Business Education, Vocational
Business schools in Australia
Vocational schools